Matti Kamenz (born 9 August 1998) is a German footballer who plays as a goalkeeper for Greifswalder FC.

References

External links
 Profile at DFB.de
 Profile at kicker.de
 

1998 births
Living people
People from Spremberg
Footballers from Brandenburg
German footballers
Association football goalkeepers
FC Energie Cottbus II players
FC Energie Cottbus players
FSV Zwickau players
3. Liga players
Regionalliga players